George Branche is a Sierra Leonean Olympic middle-distance runner. He represented his country in the men's 1500 meters, men's 800 meters, and men's 4 x 400 metres relay at the 1980 Summer Olympics. His time was a 4:03.84 in the 1500, a 1:54.60 in the 800 heats, and a 3:25.00 in the relay.

References

1953 births
Living people
Sierra Leonean male middle-distance runners
Olympic athletes of Sierra Leone
Athletes (track and field) at the 1980 Summer Olympics